Dunes in philately refers to the many editions of stamps produced in the Trucial States (today the United Arab Emirates or UAE). The stamps, printed in great profusion in the 1960s and early 1970s, are mostly near-worthless today.

History 

Britain managed the Trucial States' external relations (a result of the 1892 "Exclusive Agreement" treaty), including the management of posts and telegraphs - the states were not members of the UPU - the Universal Postal Union). The Government of India opened its first post office in Dubai in 1941 and its operation was taken over by British Postal Agencies, a subsidiary of the GPO (General Post Office) in 1948. Stamps of the time were British stamps surcharged with rupee values, until in 1959 a set of "Trucial States" stamps was issued from Dubai.

In 1963, Britain ceded responsibility for the Trucial States' postal systems to the Rulers of the Trucial States. An American philatelic entrepreneur, Finbar Kenny, saw the opportunity to create a number of editions of stamps aimed at the lucrative collector's market and in 1964 concluded a deal with the cash-strapped emirate of Ajman to take the franchise for the production of stamps for the government. Kenny had made something of a specialty out of signing these deals, also signing with the Ruler of Fujairah in 1964, and getting involved in a bribery case in the U.S. over his dealings with the government of the Cook Islands.

These stamps, luridly illustrated  and irrelevant to the actual emirates they came from (editions included "Space Research" and "Tokyo Olympic Games", with two odd editions issued from Umm Al Qawain including "British Kings and Queens" and, with summer temperatures in Umm Al Qawain reaching 50 °C, "Winter Olympics"), became known collectively as "dunes".

Value 

The sale of postage stamps was for a short time a lucrative trade for the emirates, most of whom (with the exception of Abu Dhabi, which struck oil in 1965) had few other sources of revenue. Revenues of up to £70,000 for the poorer states fell, however, to £30,000 with the inevitable saturation of the market. Their sale by 1966 constituted the main source of revenue for the northern Trucial States.

Their proliferation eventually devalued them and, because of this, many popular catalogues today do not even list them.

Among these editions, following the opening of a "post office" in Manama on 5 July 1966, were nine editions published from 'Manama, Dependency of Ajman'. Few collectors would realise Manama was a remote agricultural village consisting of a few adobe houses on a plain overlooked by the Hajar Mountains.

Kenny's arrangements ended when the United Arab Emirates was formed in December 1971.

See also 
 Postage stamps and postal history of the United Arab Emirates

References 

Philatelic collections
Philatelic fakes and forgeries